Chrysops moechus is a species of deer fly in the family Tabanidae.

Distribution
Canada, United States.

References

Tabanidae
Insects described in 1875
Diptera of North America
Taxa named by Carl Robert Osten-Sacken